The River Niger is a 1976 film adaptation of the 1972 Joseph A. Walker play of the same title. The film was directed by Krishna Shah, and starred James Earl Jones, Cicely Tyson, and Louis Gossett Jr. The film had a limited commercial release in 1976 and has rarely been seen in later years. The soundtrack is by War, including the theme song "River Niger".

Plot
Johnny Williams (James Earl Jones) is a working house painter and amateur poet who is trying to live in a contemporary ghetto in Watts, Los Angeles, California. Though he is trying to provide for his almost stable family, times are hard. Johnny's main pride and joy, his son Jeff (played by Glynn Turman) just returned from U.S. Air Force flight school, where he finally reveals that he flunked out, causing great disillusionment. This film follows Johnny's struggle and a few who try to help, including his physician friend Dr. Dudley Stanton (Louis Gossett Jr.), who purchases Johnny's poems while treating his ailing wife Mattie (played by Cicely Tyson), whose cancer is recurring. When Johnny's son kills a local gang member, and the gang shoots a police officer, the situation escalates to a standoff with the police and another shootout in Johnny's house.

Cast
 Cicely Tyson as Mattie Williams
 James Earl Jones as Johnny Williams
 Louis Gossett Jr. as Dr. Dudley Stanton
 Glynn Turman as Jeff Williams
 Jonelle Allen as Ann Vanderguild
 Roger E. Mosley as Moe "Big Moe" Hayes
 Ralph Wilcox as Al
 Teddy Wilson as "Chips"
 Charles Weldon as "Skeeter"
 Zakes Mokae as "Dutch"
 Tony Burton as Policeman

References

External links
 
 
 

1976 films
American films based on plays
Films set in Los Angeles
1976 drama films
1970s English-language films